Hironori (written: 浩典, 浩徳, 浩得, 博紀, 宏範, 大徳, 宏典 or 弘則) is a masculine Japanese given name. Notable people with the name include:

, Japanese footballer
, Japanese singer and idol
, Japanese voice actor
, Japanese footballer
, Japanese footballer
, Japanese kareteka
, Japanese footballer
, Japanese racing driver
, Japanese sumo wrestler

Japanese masculine given names